Svetlana Vasilyevna Pakhomova (born 20 June 1965) is a Russian wheelchair curler playing as second for the Russian wheelchair curling team. She and her team won the silver medal at the 2014 Paralympic Games and gold medals at the 2012, 2015 and 2016 World Championships.

Biography
In 1994, Pakhomova and her whole family were in a car accident, the future curler injured her spine. She won the Junior National Swimming Championships.

Pakhomova started her curling career in September 2007. She was national champion of 2011/2012 as a member of the club "Stolitsa". During the 2012/2013 season she became third at the nationals, now playing for Moscow Oblast.

She is a graduate of the Moscow Institute of Electronics and Mathematics.

Personal life
Being married, she has two sons, Dmitry and Nikita, with her husband Aleksandr.

Awards 
 Medal of the Order "For Merit to the Fatherland" I class (17 March 2014) – for the huge contribution to the development of physical culture and sports, and for the high athletic performances at the 2014 Paralympic Winter Games in Sochi
 Merited Master of Sports of Russia (2013)

References

External links 
 

1965 births
Living people
Russian female curlers
Russian wheelchair curlers
Paralympic wheelchair curlers of Russia
Paralympic medalists in wheelchair curling
Paralympic silver medalists for Russia
Wheelchair curlers at the 2014 Winter Paralympics
Medalists at the 2014 Winter Paralympics
World wheelchair curling champions
People from Dolgoprudny
Recipients of the Medal of the Order "For Merit to the Fatherland" I class
Sportspeople from Moscow Oblast
21st-century Russian women